Walter Kubilius (November 22, 1918 – September 22, 1993) was an American science fiction (short fiction) writer.

A member of the influential science fiction fandom club Futurians, his style was characterized as "pedestrian, out-at-the-elbows prose" by James Blish.

Works
 December 1932: Letter (The Same as Earthians), in Wonder Stories
 June 1941: Trail's End, in Stirring Science Stories
1941. Caridi Shall Not Die!
1941. The Unusual Case
1942. Atrakin and the Man
1942. Galactic Ghost
1942. Parrots of Venus
1942. Remember Me, Kama!
1942. The Day Has Come
1942. Voice In The Void
1943. Journey's End
1944. A Handful of Stars
1951. Eternal Earthling
1951. The Gray Cloud
1951. The Other Side, reprinted in "Best Of" anthologies
1951. Turn Backward, O Time!
1951. Ultimate Purpose
1952. Go to the Ant
1952. Second Chance
1952. Solution Vital
1953. Secret Invasion

References

The list of works is taken from the "Walter Kubilius" webpage, released under Creative Commons License

External links

 

American science fiction writers
1918 births
1993 deaths
American male short story writers
20th-century American novelists
American male novelists
20th-century American short story writers
20th-century American male writers